Alexander George Penfold (14 May 1901 – 28 September 1982) was an English first-class cricketer active 1924–30 who played for Surrey. He was born in Kenley; died in Isfield.

References

1901 births
1982 deaths
English cricketers
Surrey cricketers
Tamil Nadu cricketers
Europeans cricketers
People from the London Borough of Croydon
People from Isfield